The Manchester Academy of Fine Arts (MAFA) was founded in 1859 by artists eager to promote art and education. It was originally based in the building on Mosley Street which is now Manchester Art Gallery where annual exhibitions and classes were held.

Exhibitions and workshops
The Academy holds member exhibitions, talks and workshops at venues across Greater Manchester and North West England. Venues have included Bury Art Museum, Gallery Oldham, Salford Museum and Art Gallery, Atkinson Art Gallery, Southport, Stockport War Memorial Art Gallery and Dean Clough.

Membership
There is currently an elected membership (full and associate members) of over one hundred artists working in a variety of disciplines including painting, printmaking, drawing, sculpture and ceramics. Members have played a significant role in the Manchester art scene for over a century, including the design of several of its buildings and public works.

Past members
Past members of the Manchester Academy of Fine Arts have included Alfred Waterhouse (architect of Manchester Town Hall), Ford Madox Brown, LS Lowry, Käthe Schuftan, Norman Adams, Emmanuel Levy and Anne Redpath. Past presidents  have included the artists William Knight Keeling and Robert Crozier. Annie Swynnerton and Emma Magnus were some of the first pioneering women to be elected  in 1884. The work of John Cassidy, the first sculptor member, can be seen in Manchester city centre.

Manchester School of Art
The Academy has close links with art education and currently supports graduate students at Manchester School of Art, now part of Manchester Metropolitan University, by awarding annual prizes and offering the opportunity to show work in Academy exhibitions. A link with Manchester Metropolitan University has existed since the Academy's foundation: past and present members have taught and studied there. Some have studied elsewhere under recognised artists: Margaret Pilkington was taught by Lucien Pissarro at the Slade, Harry Rutherford studied under Walter Sickert and John McCombs was taught by Leon Kossoff at St Martin's School of  Art.

Presidents

External links

References

Dewsbury, Sheila, The Story So Far: The Manchester Academy of Fine Arts, 1859–2003.
Davies, Peter (1989), A Northern School, Bristol: Redcliffe Press.
Davies, Peter (2015), A Northern School Revisited, Clark Art Ltd.
Wyke, Terry (2004), Public Sculpture in Greater Manchester, Liverpool University Press.
Manchester Academt of Fine Arts, Archive.
Marks, Diana F. (2006), Children's Book Award Handbook, Libraries Unlimited (Chapter 6 on Randolph Caldecott and the Randolph Caldecott Medal).
Nairne, Sandy and Howgate, Sarah (15 March 2006), The Portrait Now, Yale University Press.
Thomson, Susan W. (2007), Manchester's Victorian Art Scene and its Unrecognised Artists, Manchester Art Press.
Buckman, David (17 September 2003), "Tom Titherington: Obituary", The Independent.

F
Culture in Manchester
Arts organisations based in the United Kingdom
1859 establishments in England
Arts organizations established in 1859
Organizations established in 1859
Organisations based in Manchester
Organisations based in Greater Manchester
Clubs and societies in Greater Manchester